Rians may refer to the following places in France:

Rians, Cher, a commune in the department of Cher
Rians, Var, a commune in the department of Var